Kortes Dam (National ID # WY01294) is a dam in Carbon County, Wyoming.

The concrete gravity dam was constructed between 1946 and 1951 by the United States Bureau of Reclamation, with a height of 244 feet, and a length of 440 feet at its crest.  It impounds the North Platte River for hydroelectric power.  Owned and operated by the Bureau, it stands as part of the Kortes Unit of the vast Pick–Sloan Missouri Basin Program less than two miles downstream from the Bureau's larger Seminoe Dam.

The riverine reservoir it creates, Kortes Reservoir, has a water surface of 83 acres and a volume of 4,765 acre-feet confined to the narrow Black Canyon, which is not stocked with fish and has no boat ramp facilities.  However, the five and a half river miles from the base of Kortes Dam downstream to the Pathfinder Reservoir, the Miracle Mile Area, has eleven primitive camping areas and fishing for brown trout, cutthroat trout, rainbow trout, and walleye.

References

External links

Dams in Wyoming
Reservoirs in Wyoming
United States Bureau of Reclamation dams
Dams completed in 1951
Buildings and structures in Carbon County, Wyoming
Dams on the North Platte River
Landforms of Carbon County, Wyoming
Hydroelectric power plants in Wyoming
1951 establishments in Wyoming